Raymond Broshears (February 14, 1935 – January 10, 1982) was a gay Pentecostal Evangelist preacher and activist who founded the Lavender Panthers, an armed self-defense group for the LGBT community in San Francisco, active from the summer of 1973 until  the spring of 1974. He also helped organize the first gay pride march in San Francisco in June 1972 and founded the Orthodox Episcopal Church of God.

Background. 
After enlisting in the Navy in the 1950s, Raymond Broshears was discharged for a head injury. He enrolled in the Pentecostal Robert E. Lee Bible College in Cleveland, Tennessee in the mid fifties, and became a travelling preacher in the early 1960s. His advocacy efforts included fronts such as gay rights and civil rights.

Broshears moved west to Long Beach, California, and established a ministry and community centre on Skid Row designed to improve the quality of life for people living below the poverty line.

Secret Service. 
Broshears was interviewed by the Secret Service in 1968, while he was living in Long Beach, California. The interview regarded information he knew about the assassination of John. F. Kennedy. David Ferrie admitted and detailed his involvement in the plot to Broshears, after the two met at a bar in New Orleans in1965 and became roommates. Ferrie had fallen on tough times, having been fired from his job for homosexuality. He joined the ranks of a group with the goal of overthrowing the United States government, according to the Secret Service. It was not a voluntary decision, however, as Ferrie was being blackmailed and occasionally stalked and followed. This made him extremely paranoid and anxious.

The plot, as described by Ferrie to Broshears, and later by Broshears to district attorney Jim Garrison, was for Ferrie to fly the two assassins from Huston, Texas to South Africa, as South Africa has no extradition treaties with the United States, and they could stay there relatively easily. Ferrie goes on to claim that he slept with Lee Harvey Oswald, and that Oswald was set up. Ferrie was paranoid, and Broshears suggested that Ferrie see a psychiatrist.

Broshears was then arrested by the United States Secret Service in around September 1965 after stating in front of a judge, "President Johnson, who was responsible directly, or indirectly, for the assassination of our beloved President Kennedy, should be put to death." These comments were based on information gained from Ferrie.

Lavender Panthers. 
The late 60s and early 70s were a dangerous time politically for queer people, and Broshears picked up on a lack of protection from local law enforcement. He created the Lavender Panthers in response. The organisation was formed in July 1973, following a violent attack outside of Broshears’ community centre, Helping Hands, that left him unconscious.

Controversy. 
Broshears' go-to response to violence and the threatening letters he constantly received was to report the actions to either the San Francisco Police Department, or the FBI; the latter of which has a file of three hundred pages of reports and documents on him; communications between Broshears and various special agents, as well as a large volume of threats he received. Newspaper articles flanked by hate speech and explicit threats were regularly mailed to Broshears.

Other gay rights organizations, however, saw the aggressive tactics that the Lavender Panthers were using, and were threatened.

References

External links

1935 births
1982 deaths
American LGBT rights activists
United States Navy sailors
Lee University alumni